Sodomites is a 1998 short film written and directed by Gaspar Noé. The film is a hardcore safe-sex promo that was made for French television in the late 1990s. Noé called the film "a bomb of energy" and has stated that it caused French censorship laws to change to the point where he could make Irréversible (2002) "with complete freedom".

Cast
 Marc Barrow as the Rectal Beast
 Coralie Trinh Thi as Sodoma
 Mano Solo as the Master
 Philippe Nahon as a spectator

References

External links

1998 television films
1998 films
1990s French-language films
French short films
Films directed by Gaspar Noé
1990s French films